The women's artistic gymnastics balance beam final at the 2019 European Games was held at the Minsk Arena on June 30.

Qualification 

Qualification took place on June 27. Nina Derwael from Belgium qualified in first, followed by France's Lorette Charpy and Angelina Melnikova of Russia.

The reserves were:

Medalists

Results 
Oldest and youngest competitors

References

Gymnastics at the 2019 European Games